The Coromandel skink (Oligosoma pachysomaticum) is a species of skink found in New Zealand.

References

Oligosoma
Reptiles described in 1975
Reptiles of New Zealand
Endemic fauna of New Zealand
Taxa named by Joan Robb
Endemic reptiles of New Zealand